Toba Regency is a landlocked regency in North Sumatra. Its seat is Balige. The regency covers an area of 2,021.8 square kilometres; it had a population of 173,129 at the 2010 census and 206,199 at the 2020 Census. It includes the eastern shore of the vast inland Lake Toba. The regency was formerly known as Toba Samosir Regency, until its name was officially shortened in 2020.

Administrative districts 
The regency is divided administratively into sixteen districts (kecamatan), tabulated below with their areas and their populations at the 2010 Census and the 2020 Census. The table also includes the locations of the district administrative centres, the number of administrative villages (desa and kelurahan) in each district and its post code:

Orchid Paradise
Two scientists explored the Eden Park tourist forest in Sionggang village in Toba Regency for four years and have successfully identified almost 200 new species of forest orchids. The area is an orchid paradise, in which thousands of other orchid species can be found.

Sigura-Gura waterfall
Below the waterfall, one can do White water rafting.

References

Regencies of North Sumatra